Cornelis Jacobsen Mey, often spelled Cornelius Jacobsz May in Dutch, was a Dutch explorer, captain, and fur trader. Cape May, New Jersey and Cape May County, New Jersey are both named after him.

Family
May is believed to have been from Hoorn in the northwest Netherlands but may have been born in the smaller village of Schellinkhout, located just east of Hoorn. His brother is believed to have been Jan Jacobszoon May van Schellinkhout for whom the island of Jan Mayen is named. Both brothers were cousins of Jan Cornelisz May, a prominent Dutch sailor and voyager who led several expeditions to the Northeast passage and circumnavigated the world with Joris van Spilbergen between 1614 and 1617.

1614 to 1616 expeditions in North America
In 1614, May was the first to sail the Mauritius River, now known as the Hudson River, where he entered into an agreement with various competing Indian tribal traders. On October 11, 1614, May became party to the New Netherland Company, which received an exclusive patent from the States General of the Netherlands for four voyages to be undertaken for the next three years to territories discovered between the 40th and 45th parallels at the exclusion of all other Dutch through January 1618.

From August 1616 to November 1616, the New Netherland Company tried unsuccessfully to secure a patent for a territory located between the 38th and 40th parallels at Delaware Bay, which had been surveyed from 1614 to 1615 by Cornelis Hendricksz from Monnikendam on the ship Onrust. In 1616, Cornelis Hendricksen, sailed the Onrust up the Zuyd Rivier, now known as the Delaware River, from Delaware Bay to its northernmost navigable reaches, on a voyage to ransom three fur traders taken from Fort Nassau on the North River.

On behalf of the successor company of the New Netherland Company, May explored and surveyed the Delaware Bay on a ship named Blijde Boodschap and engaged in trade with the Indians there in 1620. In 1621, he ordered the construction of a factory at Fort Nassau at the mouth of Big Timber Creek.

Two of the six business partners with two ships, Blijde Boodschap and Bever, focused on exploration and trade in the Zuidt Rivier, or Delaware River, were Thijmen Jacobsz Hinlopen and Samuel Godijn. Cape Hinlopen, now spelled Cape Henlopen in Delaware, is named after Thijmen Jacobsz Hinlopen.  Cape Hinlopen was New Netherland's most southern border on the 38th parallel. Godyn's Bay, now Delaware Bay, was named for Samuel Godyn, one of the first patrons in New Netherland and a director of the Dutch West India Company and the Northern Company.

First colonists of New Netherlands
May was unable to trade in the South River, now known as the Delaware River, to the exclusion of competing Dutch companies. Though the competing Dutch companies were eventually able to reach agreement on New Netherlands, discord arose again which was finally settled by arbitrators in Amsterdam, on December 23, 1623. In 1624, the 38th and 39th parallels region came under the final jurisdiction of the Dutch West India Company with the delivery of New Netherland, including the Walloon and Flemish families. 

May was the captain of the ship New Netherland which delivered the first boat load of colonists to New Netherland, first at Fort Orange, the trading post near present-day Albany, New York, and then on Governors Island, in present-day New York City, in 1624. In the spring of 1624,  May returned to New Netherlands in command of the Nieu Nederlandt with the first group of settlers, mostly young Walloon families. Some were sent to company lands in Connecticut. Two families and eight single males took a sloop to the Zuidt (South) River, now the Delaware River, and established Fort Wilhelmus. Eight men were also left on Nut Island to promote the fur trade, and the remaining 18 families proceeded to Fort Orange. Having transformed New Netherlands into a Dutch province, May was named the province's first director.

See also
 Dutch colonization of the Americas
 Dutch Empire
 List of colonial governors of New Jersey
 List of colonial governors of New York

References 

16th-century births
17th-century deaths
17th-century Dutch explorers
Directors of New Netherland
Dutch explorers of North America
Dutch sailors
Explorers of the United States
People from Hoorn
People from Venhuizen
People of the Province of New York